This is a list of Native American politicians in the United States. These are Native Americans who served in the federal, state, or municipal governments.

Native American identity is a complex and contested issue. The Bureau of Indian Affairs defines Native American as having American Indian or Alaska Native ancestry. Legally, being Native American is defined as being enrolled in a federally recognized tribe or Alaskan village. These entities establish their own membership rules, and they vary. Each must be understood independently. Ethnologically, factors such as culture, history, language, religion, and familial kinships can influence Native American identity.

All individuals on this list should have Native American ancestry. Historical figures might predate tribal enrollment practices and may be included based on reliable sources that document ethnological tribal membership. Any contemporary individuals should either be enrolled members of federally recognized tribes, or have cited Native American ancestry and be recognized as Native American by their respective tribes(s). Contemporary individuals who are not enrolled in a tribe but are documented as having tribal descent are listed as being "of descent" from a tribe.

For tribal leaders, please go to that tribe's article.

Federal offices

Executive branch

Legislative branch

State offices

Alaska

Arizona

Arkansas

California

Colorado

Idaho

Illinois

Kansas

Kentucky

Maine

Massachusetts

Michigan

Minnesota

Mississippi

Montana

Nebraska

Nevada

New Mexico

North Carolina

North Dakota

Oklahoma

Oregon

Pennsylvania

South Dakota

Tennessee

Utah

Washington

Wyoming

Municipal offices

Arizona
 Roberta Cano, (Navajo, Zuni Pueblo) Winslow Mayor (2021-present)

California
 Tasha Cerda (Tohono O'odham Nation), Gardena Mayor (2017–present), City Council (2009–2013)
 Todd Gloria (Tlingit-Haida), San Diego Mayor (2020–present; 2013–2014 (acting)), San Diego City Councilman (2008–2016), San Diego City Council President (2012–2014)
Mitch O'Farrell (Wyandotte), Los Angeles City Councilman (2013-2022), President of the Los Angeles City Council (2022)

Idaho
  William (Bill) Weems, (Coeur d'Alene) Plummer City Council (2012–2016) Mayor (2016–present)

Maine
 April Fournier, (Navajo) Portland, Maine Portland City Council At-Large (2021-present)

Minnesota
  Renee Van Nett, (Leech Lake Ojibwe) Duluth City Council

New Mexico
 April J. Silversmith, Navajo Democrat (Gallup, NM Magistrate Judge)
 Carol Bowman Muskett, Navajo Democrat (McKinley County, NM Commissioner District I)
 Genevieve Jackson, Navajo Democrat (McKinley County, NM Commissioner District II)
 Harriet K. Becenti, Navajo Democrat (McKinley County, NM Clerk)
 Thommy Nelson, Navajo Democrat (McKinley County, NM Probate Judge)
 Felix Begay, Navajo Democrat (McKinley County, NM Sheriff)
 Earnest Becenti, Navajo Democrat (Mckinley County, NM County Treasurer)
 GloJean Todacheene, Navajo Democrat (San Juan County, NM Commissioner District I)

Oklahoma
 John Tyler Hammons (b. 1988, Cherokee Nation), mayor of Muskogee, Oklahoma (2008–2012)

 David Holt (b. 1979, Osage Nation), mayor of Oklahoma City, Oklahoma (2018-present)

Utah 
 Willie Grayeyes, Navajo Democrat (San Juan County, UT Commission
 Kenneth Maryboy, Navajo Democrat (San Juan County, UT Commission )
 Robin Troxell, Hopi Tribe of Arizona (Brigham City Councilmember)

Washington
 Christopher Roberts, (b. 1978,) Choctaw Democrat, (Shoreline City Council (2010–present)
 Roxanne Murphy, (Nooksack) Bellingham City Council [2012–2018]
 Debora Juarez, (Blackfeet) Seattle City Council [2016–present]

Wisconsin

 Wahsayah Whitebird, (b. 1991) Ojibwe Communist, City Council of Ashland, Wisconsin [2019-2021]
Kristie Goforth, (Sault Tribe of Chippewa Indians), Monona City Council [2020–present]

Other offices
 Diego Archuleta (1814 – 1884), Member of the Mexican Congress, soldier in the Mexican Army, in the Mexican–American War, Native American Agent by President Abraham Lincoln, and member of the Union Army (US Army) during the American Civil War. He was the first Hispanic Brigadier General.
 Fleming Begaye Sr. (1921–2019) (Navajo) – Navajo Code Talker, Honorary Chair of the Native American Coalition of the Donald J. Trump for President Campaign, 2016.
 Elias Cornelius Boudinot (1835–1890) (Cherokee) —  Tribal Representative to the Confederate Congress, 1862–65. Represented the Cherokee Nation.
 Samuel Benton Callahan (1833–1911) (Creek) —  Tribal Representative to the Confederate Congress, 1864–65. Represented the Creek and Seminole nations.
 Plenty Coups (1848–1932) (Crow) – Representative of Native Americans for the dedication of the Tomb Of The Unknown Soldier
 Robert McDonald Jones (1808–1872) (Choctaw) —  Tribal Representative to the Confederate Congress, 1863–65. Represented the Choctaw and Chickasaw nations.
 Dana Loesch (born 1978) (Cherokee) — radio host, TV personality, former spokesperson for the National Rifle Association.
 Peter MacDonald (born 1928) (Navajo) – Member of Richard Nixon's Committee to Re-Elect the President (CRP) in 1972.
 Will Rogers (1879–1935, Cherokee), honorary mayor of Beverly Hills, California
 Clarence L. Tinker (1887–1942) (Osage) – Major General, highest ranking Native American officer in the Army, Commander of the 7th Air Force in Hawaii, shot down and killed during the Battle of Midway.

References

External links
 Political Graveyard's list of Native American politicians

Politicians
 
Native American